Ommo may refer to:

 Ommo Clark, Nigerian software designer
 Umā, a Hindu goddess, historically known as Ommo

See also
 Omo (disambiguation)